Jordan Tansey (born ) is an English rugby league footballer who plays as a  or er. 

He has previously played for Crusaders RL, Castleford Tigers (Heritage № 932), Hull FC, Leeds Rhinos and the Wakefield Trinity Wildcats in the Super League, the York City Knights in the Co-operative Championship and the Sydney Roosters in the NRL. Tansey has also played temporarily for the Dewsbury Rams and the Huddersfield Giants and on a permanent basis for Betfred League 1 side Workington Town.

He is perhaps best known for scoring the decisive try in Leeds Rhinos' Millennium Magic 2007 match against the Bradford Bulls, when he followed up a Kevin Sinfield penalty in the last play of the game which hit the crossbar; had the penalty gone over Leeds would only have drawn 38-38.

Early life
As a child Tansey lived in Whinmoor, Leeds. He attended Boston Spa Comprehensive School from 1998-2002, where he played for the school football team as a striker. Fellow pro Rugby League player Danny Williams also attended Boston Spa school and played for the same football team as Tansey. The two would eventually transition to Rugby despite Boston Spa School not having an actual Rugby team.

Sydney Roosters
On 1 October 2008, Tansey agreed to a deal with Australian NRL side Sydney Roosters for two years. He was meant to rejoin the Leeds Rhinos but instead, on 4 June 2009, Tansey signed with the Hull FC for the 2010 season.

Return to Super League 
He returned to England with the Hull FC rugby league club after being granted an early release from the Sydney Roosters against their win over the Crusaders. His contract was terminated following a disciplinary hearing in February 2011. He subsequently joined Crusaders. Tansey signed a one-year contract with York City Knights in January 2012. He then joined Castleford Tigers in 2013, playing for two years before being transferred to Wakefield Trinity Wildcats mid-season in 2015.

In 2018, he had trials with Hull Kingston Rovers and the Sheffield Eagles.

References

External links
Workington Town profile
Cas Tigers profile
(archived by web.archive.org) Profile at LeedsRugby

1986 births
Living people
Castleford Tigers players
Crusaders Rugby League players
Dewsbury Rams players
English rugby league players
Huddersfield Giants players
Hull F.C. players
Leeds Rhinos players
People educated at Boston Spa Academy
Rugby league fullbacks
Rugby league players from Leeds
Sydney Roosters players
Wakefield Trinity players
Workington Town players
York City Knights players